MLR Institute of Technology (MLRIT) is located at Dundigal, Hyderabad, Telangana, India. The institution was started in 2005 by the KMR Education Trust, headed by Mr. Marri Laxman Reddy. The Institute has Six UG courses along with Seven PG Courses. The Institute is affiliated with Jawaharlal Nehru Technological University, Hyderabad (JNTUH). It was granted Autonomous status by University Grants Commission (India) in the year 2015.

Courses 
The institute offers a four-year degree Bachelor of Technology, in Nine key disciplines:
Department of Aeronautical Engineering.
Department of Computer Science & Engineering (CSE).
Department of Computer Science & Engineering (AI & ML).
Department of Computer Science & Engineering (Data Science).
Department of Computer Science & Engineering (Cyber Security).
 Information Technology (IT).
Department of Electronics and Communication Engineering (ECE).
Department of Mechanical Engineering (ME).
Department of Electrical and Electronics Engineering(EEE).

Every semester has a minimum of eight courses, which includes a minimum of two laboratory courses. Students are required to attend the institute for duration of not less than four years and not more than eight years to be considered for the award of the degree. The institute follows JNTUH strict attendance regulation, which requires students to put in a minimum class attendance of 75% to progress to the next semester. External (university) exams are held every semester in the campus and consolidated results in all these exams count towards the final aggregate grading.

Admissions 
The minimum criterion for admission is 50% marks in the Intermediate/10+2 Examination. Students are admitted primarily based on their ranks in the Common Entrance Test EAMCET, held by the JNTUH, Telangana every year.

Departments 
The institute has 13 departments:
Department of Aeronautical Engineering
Department of Artificial Intelligence & Machine Learning
Department of Computer Science & Engineering
Department of Computer Science & Engineering - Cyber Security
Department of Computer Science & Engineering - Data Science
Department of Electronics and Communication Engineering
Department of Information Technology
Department of Computer Science & Information Technology
Department of Mechanical Engineering
Department of Electrical and Electronics Engineering
Department of Mathematics and Humanities
Department of Physical Education
Department of R&D

Industry Associations 
The institute has associations and MOUs with a lot of industries in various fields for imparting training to students at a professional level, some of them include IBM, Microsoft, Tata Advanced Systems, National Instruments, Dassault Systems to name a few.

External links 
 

Universities and colleges in Hyderabad, India
2005 establishments in Andhra Pradesh
Educational institutions established in 2005